Jonah Jamison Goldstein (April 6, 1886 – July 22, 1967) was a Republican General Sessions Judge from New York, and the Republican candidate for Mayor of New York City in the 1945 election, losing to William O'Dwyer. He died in 1967, in Bethlehem, New Hampshire.

Goldstein was Jewish, and he served on several Jewish institutions and was active in many New York welfare activities. He also served as president of the Grand Street Boys Association.

References

External links
Guide to the Jonah J. Goldstein (1886-1967) Papers at the American Jewish Historical Society, New York.

1886 births
1967 deaths
New York (state) state court judges
New York (state) politicians
New York (state) Republicans
20th-century American judges
Jewish American people in New York (state) politics
Canadian emigrants to the United States